Richard "Rick" Glazier (born June 16, 1955, in Allentown, Pennsylvania) served as a Democratic member of the North Carolina House of Representatives, representing the 45th district, from 2003 until his resignation in 2015. He resigned to become executive director of the North Carolina Justice Center.

For part of his tenure in the legislature, Glazier served as a House Minority Whip. He has also been an adjunct professor of law at Campbell University's Norman Adrian Wiggins School of Law.

Electoral history

2014

2012

2010

2008

2006

2004

2002

References

External links
North Carolina General Assembly - Representative Richard Glazier official NC House website
Project Vote Smart - Representative Rick Glazier (NC) profile
Follow the Money - Rick Glazier
2008 2006 2004 2002 campaign contributions

|-

1955 births
Living people
Democratic Party members of the North Carolina House of Representatives
Politicians from Allentown, Pennsylvania
21st-century American politicians